Adventure Con was a for-profit media expo with a science fiction and comic theme held annually in Knoxville, Tennessee.

The convention was usually attended by sci-fi groups and clubs who set up booths annually, including the 501st Legion, Rebel Legion, the Dark Empire, the Knoxville Sci-Fi Club, the Tennessee Star Wars Collectors Group, and various costuming and collecting groups. In addition, the show featured a wide variety of dealers selling toys, comics, cards, and film / television memorabilia.

History 
Adventure Con was founded by Marcus Wollack, and was first held June 1–2, 2002, at the Knoxville Expo Center (5441 Clinton Highway, Knoxville, Tennessee). 2003 saw two shows, a late spring event and a fall event. The spring 2003 show was held at the Gatlinburg Convention Center in Gatlinburg, Tennessee. Beginning in 2005, the show moved to the Knoxville Convention Center (701 Henley Street, Knoxville, Tennessee), which features nearly 50,000 square feet of exhibitor space. The 2005 show featured two full days of gaming events and tournaments. The 2006 show featured a replica of the Back to the Future Delorean.

In 2007 Adventure Con was acquired by Las Vegas Autographs, LLC. The new owners vowed to increase the emphasis on comic books and attract 10,000 visitors. The 2007 show made national news for a Star Wars-themed wedding, which on June 2 was featured on nearly every local news broadcast in the nation that evening. The 2008 show included a special concert by Smith & Pyle, and a "birthday party" for Friday the 13th's Jason Voorhees.

In 2009, Adventure Con again featured two events, a summer and a fall show. For the fall show, Adventure Con moved to the Pigeon Forge Convention Center located at the Grand Hotel. The 2010 show, also held at the Pigeon Forge Convention Center, was half the size of the previous year, disorganized, and many dealers complained about the poor lighting.

Adventure Con 2011, the tenth anniversary show, was originally going to be held July 10–12, 2011, back in Knoxville. However, on May 6, 2011, the home page of the Adventure Con website was updated, notifying fans that the show was being pushed back to a later date. The Celebrity Guests and Comic Book Industry Guests pages were deleted. The original celebrity guests included Erika Eleniak, Tony Todd, Tara (wrestler), Lee Arenberg, Valerie Perrine, Barbara Nedeljakova, Nalini Krishan, Cindy Morgan, Richard LeParmentier, and Tony Curran. There was originally no information on comic book industry guests.

The tenth anniversary show was rescheduled for October 12–13, 2012, back in Knoxville. As of June 27, 2012, it had not been specified whether the original guests would still be appearing at the show.

Dates and locations

Events with similar names
 Adventure Con 2003 took place March 8, 2003, in Allentown, Pennsylvania.
 There was an unrelated gaming convention called AdventureCon tentatively planned for 2008 in Atlantic City, New Jersey. This event, originally scheduled for August 2007 in Las Vegas, was to celebrate the work of game designer Scott Adams and his most famous creation, Adventureland.
 There is an unrelated fantasy and science fiction games convention called Adventure Convention held each February in Hamburg, Germany. The next of these events is scheduled for March 1–3, 2013.

References 

Defunct science fiction conventions in the United States
Defunct comics conventions
Economy of Knoxville, Tennessee
Conventions in Tennessee
Culture of Knoxville, Tennessee
Tourist attractions in Knoxville, Tennessee
Recurring events established in 2002
2002 establishments in Tennessee